Omoglymmius longiceps is a species of beetle in the subfamily Rhysodidae. It was described by Grouvelle in 1910.

References

longiceps
Beetles described in 1910